TLQ or tlq may refer to:

 TLQ, the IATA code for Turpan Jiaohe Airport, Xinjiang, China
 TLQ, the station code for Taloo railway station, Pakistan
 tlq, the ISO 639-3 code for Tai Loi language, Burma and Laos